Regional School Unit 74 (RSU 74), formerly Maine School Administrative District 74 (MSAD 74), is an operating school district within Somerset County, Maine, covering the towns of Anson, Embden, New Portland, North Anson and Solon.

References

External links

74
74